The marching arts are a collection of fine arts related activities that are closely associated with wind music. The marching arts include, but are not necessarily limited to marching band, drum corps, pep band, color guard, winter guard, and indoor percussion. All of these activities are supported at both the high school and collegiate levels.

Although marching and pep bands initially existed to fill the role of halftime entertainment at football games, the modern marching arts, while maintaining their enduring traditions, have grown into stand-alone activities. The marching arts often participate in competitive events with panels of adjudicators assessing the groups on a number of captions. Some of the captions often assessed in competition are: music performance (ensemble), music performance (individual), music effect, visual performance, visual effect, general effect, color guard, percussion, brass, woodwinds, and drum majors, among others.

Governing bodies 
Several governing bodies exist to adjudicate and promote the marching arts:

Drum corps 

 Drum Corps International
 Drum Corps Associates
 Drum Corps Japan
 Drum Corps Europe

Marching band 

 Bands of America
 USBands
 Tournament of Bands
 Mid-America Competing Band Directors Association

Winter guard 

 Winter Guard International

References

Marching bands